Luca Oyen (born 14 March 2003) is a Belgian professional footballer who plays as a midfielder for Genk.

Club career
Oyen made his professional debut with Genk in a 2–1 Belgian First Division A win over Zulte Waregem.

International career
Oyen was born in England to Belgian parents. His father Davy Oyen was playing professional football for Nottingham Forest F.C. at that moment. He moved back to Belgium at a young age. He is a youth international for Belgium.

Honours
Genk
Belgian Cup: 2020–21

Personal life
Oyen is the son of the retired Belgium international footballer Davy Oyen.

References

External links
 
 ACFF Profile
 Belgofoot Profile
 

2003 births
Living people
Footballers from Nottingham
Belgian footballers
Belgium youth international footballers
English footballers
English people of Belgian descent
Association football midfielders
K.R.C. Genk players
Belgian Pro League players